Westfriedhof   is a cemetery in Cologne, Germany. With an area of 52 hectares, it is amongst the largest of the cemeteries in the city.

References

External links
 City of Cologne – services (in German)
 

Cemeteries in Cologne